Richmond Synagogue is an Orthodox Jewish community in  Richmond, London. The congregation, whose synagogue building is in Lichfield Gardens,  has 250 members and is a member community of the United Synagogue.

History
A Jewish community is known to have existed in Richmond in the late 17th century. King William III dined with Solomon de Medina, a Jewish businessman, at his country house in Richmond in November 1699.

Until 1916, Richmond's Jewish religious community was known as the Richmond Hebrew Congregation. From 1916 to 1938, as Richmond Associate Synagogue, it met at Central Hall, Parkshot, Richmond, a building opened on 28 June 1916 by Leopold de Rothschild, the then-President of the United Synagogue. From 1938, the renamed Richmond District Synagogue met at a converted chapel at 8 Sheen Road, which was compulsorily purchased by Richmond upon Thames Council to make way for a Waitrose supermarket and multi-storey car park.

Designed by Stern Thom Fehler Architects, a new purpose-built synagogue building at Lichfield Gardens was opened on 8 March 1987 by Chief Rabbi Sir Immanuel Jakobovits and Rabbi Moshe Barron. A rabbi's house was later built on part of the synagogue's car park.

People
Richmond Synagogue's rabbi, since June 2016, is Meir Shindler, who was previously at Chigwell and Hainault Synagogue. Previous rabbis have included Maurice Ginsberg (1922–61), Yitzchak Schochet (1991–93), Jonathan Hughes (2013–15) and Yossi Ives (2003–12).   Notable congregants have included Eldred Tabachnik and Lord Woolf.

Activities
Services are held on Friday evenings at 7:00 pm and on Saturday mornings at 9:30 am. The synagogue operates a day centre for Jewish people over 60.

See also
 List of Jewish communities in the United Kingdom
 List of synagogues in the United Kingdom

References

Further reading

Howitt, Arthur (1930). Richmond and its Jewish Connections. R W Simpson, 27pp and 12 illustrated plates
History of the Richmond Synagogue. Richmond Synagogue, 1976
Renton, Peter (2000). The Lost Synagogues of London. London: Tymsder Publications, pp. 145–6,

External links
 Official website
 JCR-UK entry on Richmond Synagogue

1916 establishments in England
1987 establishments in England
Orthodox Judaism in London
Orthodox synagogues in England
Religion in the London Borough of Richmond upon Thames
Jewish organizations established in 1916
Richmond, London
Synagogues completed in 1987
Synagogues in London